Lindsay's Boy is a 1974 Australian film about a soldier who returns from World War Two.

References

External links

Australian war drama films
1974 films
1970s English-language films
Films directed by Frank Arnold
Australian drama television films
Australian World War II films
1970s Australian films